On 15 December 2021, a Gulfstream G-IVSP, crashed at Las Américas International Airport, Punta Caucedo, Santo Domingo, Dominican Republic, killing all nine people on board, including Puerto Rican music producer Flow La Movie.

Accident 
On December 15, 2021, a Gulfstream IV registered as HI1050, departed Santo Domingo's La Isabella International Airport, en route to Orlando, Florida, before diverting to Las Americas International airport where the aircraft crashed upon an attempted landing. 9 casualties were reported and 0 survivors. The accident is pending investigation.

References

External links
CIAA Preliminary report (PDF)

Aviation accidents and incidents in 2021